Martha Alice "Mattie" Howard (November 1894–?) was a high profile American convicted criminal in Kansas City, Missouri in the early part of the 20th-century. Howard became a celebrity. She served prison time and then became an evangelist, traveling throughout the United States sharing her life story.

Biography 
She was born in Preston, Idaho in November 1894. She was the daughter of Charles P. Howard (b. 1860) and Mattie Keenan (b. 1867). She was raised in the Denver, Colorado area.

Her father was frequently absent from the home during her childhood and formative years. There were many times when coal for heating and food were in short supply. Conflict at home with her brothers eventually caused her to flee to Limon, Colorado where she worked in the Limon depot and Grier House around the age 17. For this work she received $12.00 per week, plus tips, along with free room and board. Becoming homesick, she returned home only to be pursued by a suitor which caused her to disappear again.

On the night of December 8, 1914, Mattie's brother Robert (Oliver Robert, or O.B., as he was called), Albert C. Pagel, Jr. and a third man robbed the United States Post Office in Walsenburg, Colorado.  $15,000 USD, which was supposed to go to the local bank went missing in that robbery. They committed this crime while stationed with the Cavalry, in Walsenburg, during the unrest in the coal fields of that period.  

She was accused of murdering Kansas City pawnbroker and diamond dealer Joseph Morino on May 23, 1918. Morino was found at the Touraine Hotel, 1412 Central Street. He had been killed by a blow to the head.

The downward spiral of her life continued with the death of Pagel from septic peritonitis. The sepsis was due to gunshots receiving during another criminal activity. He died on March 14, 1920, at age 28.

Howard enlisted the services of Kansas City attorney Jesse James Jr., son of the notorious outlaw. She fled Missouri in her efforts to avoid a prison term. Howard was captured in Memphis, Tennessee and returned to Kansas City for trial.

Howard was convicted at trial of second degree murder in the death of Morino. She was sentenced to the Missouri State Penitentiary where she served 7 years.

After her release from prison on May 1928. She claimed in newspapers to have then moved to Chicago where she became part of Al Capone's mob, mostly their driving cars; until she grew restless and left the life of crime when she found her religious calling on September 15, 1932. She became an evangelist and shared her story with many groups across the United States.

References 

1894 births
People from Preston, Idaho
Date of death unknown